Various kinds of agricultural inspection include:
 Biosecurity inspection
 Food inspection
 Phytosanitary inspection
 Meat inspection

See also:
 Phytosanitary certification, warranting inspection has occurred and was passed